Fazal-ur-Rehman is a retired Pakistani bureaucrat who served in BPS-22 grade as Maritime Secretary of Pakistan, Chief Secretary Sindh and Chairman Trading Corporation of Pakistan. Fazal also served as the Chief Minister of Sindh from June 2018 to August 2018 in a caretaker capacity.

Fazal remained a prominent civil servant in Sindh, having served as the provincial administrative boss twice. He retired from the civil service in 2010. Fazal was appointed to be the caretaker chief minister of Sindh ahead of the 2018 general elections and was sworn into office on 2 June 2018.

References 

Chief Minister of Sindh

Living people
Pakistani civil servants
Pakistani government officials
Chief Ministers of Sindh
Year of birth missing (living people)